Aceyalone & the Lonely Ones is a studio album by American rapper Aceyalone. It was released on Decon in 2009.

Critical reception
Andrew Martin of PopMatters gave the album 7 stars out of 10, saying, "A few missteps aside, this record remains a refreshing and creative take on an experiment that could have easily failed." Thomas Quinlan of Exclaim! said, "What really holds this album together is the live band feel that's also applied to the doo-wop and R&B choruses." Mosi Reeves of Spin called it "one of the year's most unexpected hip-hop pleasures, with the Los Angeles MC switching gears from his inventive and hugely influential rapid-fire rhyme style."

Track listing

References

Further reading

External links
 

2009 albums
Aceyalone albums
Decon albums